Niaming is an arrondissement of Médina Yoro Foulah in Kolda Region in Senegal.

References 

Arrondissements of Senegal